Chinnasamy Gounder Mahendran (ta:சி. மகேந்திரன்)  (born 1972) is an Indian politician and Member of Tamil Nadu Legislative Assembly elected from Madathukulam constituency in 2021 elections. He was previously elected to the 16th Lok Sabha, the lower house of the Parliament of India from Pollachi constituency as an All India Anna Dravida Munnetra Kazhagam candidate in 2014 election.

He was the panchayat President of the Moongiltholuvu Panchayat in Tirupur district. He completed his M.A.(Economics) in PSG College of Arts and Science, Coimbatore. He is also an agriculturalist.

Elections contested

References 

All India Anna Dravida Munnetra Kazhagam politicians
Living people
India MPs 2014–2019
Lok Sabha members from Tamil Nadu
1972 births
People from Coimbatore district
People from Tiruppur district
Tamil Nadu MLAs 2021–2026